A clarinet trio is a chamber ensemble that consists of a clarinet, a bowed string instrument and a piano, or a musical work for such an ensemble. The string instrument can be a cello, a viola, or a violin. Therefore, a clarinet trio can be referred to below:
 Clarinet-cello-piano trio
 Clarinet-viola-piano trio
 Clarinet-violin-piano trio

Notable works for clarinet trio

Wolfgang Amadeus Mozart 
 Clarinet Trio in E-flat major, K. 498 "Kegelstatt-Trio"

Ludwig van Beethoven 
 Clarinet Trio in B-flat major, Op. 11 "Gassenhauer-Trio"
 Clarinet Trio in E-flat major, Op. 38 (an arrangement of his Septet)
The clarinet part of both works by Beethoven can be and is often substituted with a violin.

Johannes Brahms 
 Clarinet Trio in A minor, Op. 114

Darius Milhaud 
 Suite for violin, clarinet and piano, Op. 157b (1936)

Béla Bartók 
 Contrasts, for clarinet, violin, and piano, Sz. 111, BB 116 (1938)

Alexander von Zemlinsky 
 Clarinet Trio, Op. 3 (1896)

Max Bruch 
 pieces for clarinet trio original for viola, but very good for cello

Nino Rota 
 Trio (1973)

Clarinet
Chamber music
Types of musical groups